The 2018–19 Coastal Carolina Chanticleers women's basketball team represents Coastal Carolina University in the 2018–19 NCAA Division I women's basketball season. The Chanticleers, led by sixth year head coach Jaida Williams, play their home games at HTC Center and were members of the Sun Belt Conference. They finished the season 17–15, 8–10 in Sun Belt play to finish in eighth place. They advanced to the second round of the Sun Belt women's tournament where they lost to Appalachian State. They received an invitation to the WBI where they lost to Campbell in the first round.

Roster

Schedule

|-
!colspan=9 style=| Non-conference regular season

|-
!colspan=9 style=| Sun Belt regular season

|-
!colspan=9 style=| Sun Belt Women's Tournament

|-
!colspan=9 style=| WBI

See also
 2018–19 Coastal Carolina Chanticleers men's basketball team

References

Coastal Carolina
Coastal Carolina Chanticleers women's basketball seasons
Coastal Carolina